Football Club Kheybar Khorramabad (Bashgah-e Futbal-e Xiber Xeremâbad), commonly known as FC Kheybar, is an Iranian football club based in Khorramabad, Lorestan, that competes in the Azadegan League.

The football team plays their home games at the Takhti Stadium which has a seating capacity of 10,000. The club is owned by Dr. Masoud Abdi.

History

Establishment
In 1984 FC Kheybar Khorramabad was founded during the Iran-Iraq War. In 2014 Khorramabad were promoted to the 2nd Division. That following year Kheybar Khorramabad finished second in their group and were placed in the promotion Play-off. Kheybar Khorramabad won against Esteghlal B 2–1 in the play-off and was promoted to the Azadegan League.

Azadegan League
On 17 August 2015 after many years in the Provincial Leagues Kheybar Khorramabad played its first ever Azadegan League match against Parseh Tehran. They won the game 3–0. Kheybar started the season strong and were one of the promotion candidates, however by the end of the season their form dropped and they finished a modest 12th place.

Supporters and Fans
Kheybar Khorramabad is one of the highest supported teams in Lorestan Province. Many people from the Lurs minority are supporting the club.

Stadium

The home venue of Kheybar Khorramabad is theTakhti Stadium Khorramabad in Khorramabad, Lorestan, Iran with a 10,000 seating capacity. It is named after Gholamreza Takhti. The stadium is located near to the Zagros Mountains and has green seats.

Season-by-season
The table below chronicles the achievements of Kheybar Khorramabad in various competitions since 2013.

Club managers
  Ali Nikbakht (2015–2016)
  Davoud Haghdoust (2016–2017)
  Mehrdad Khademi (2017–2020)
  Omid Ravankhah (2020)
  Abdollah Veisi (2020–2021)
  Mohsen Ashouri (2021– Present)

National titles
Hazfi Cup
Runner Up (1): 1986–87,
2nd Division
Third place : 2014–15, Promoted to 2015–16 Azadegan League

Players

First-team squad

References

Football clubs in Iran